"Gangsta's Paradise" is a 1995 song by Coolio featuring L.V.

Gangsta's Paradise may also refer to:

 ECW Gangstas Paradise, a 1995 professional wrestling event
 Gangsta's Paradise (album), a 1995 album by Coolio that features the song
 Gangster's Paradise: Jerusalema, a 2008 South African crime film
 Gangstas in Paradise, a professional wrestling tag team